Charles B. Foster, nicknamed "Red" or "Alabama Red", was an American Negro league first baseman between 1907 and 1911.

Foster made his Negro leagues debut in 1907 with the Birmingham Giants, and played for Birmingham again the following season. He went on to play for the San Antonio Black Bronchos, Oklahoma Monarchs, Kansas City Giants, and Kansas City Royal Giants through 1911.

References

External links
Baseball statistics and player information from Baseball-Reference Black Baseball Stats and Seamheads

Year of birth missing
Year of death missing
Place of birth missing
Place of death missing
Birmingham Giants players
Kansas City Giants players
Kansas City Royal Giants players
Oklahoma Monarchs players
San Antonio Black Bronchos players